Fairvilla is an unincorporated community in Orange County, Florida, United States. The community is located along U.S. Route 441 along the northern border of Orlando, and parts of it have been annexed by the city. The area is known as a commercial district and includes the Fairvilla Adult Superstore sex shop. During the 1980s, an urban legend began regarding a large red apeman known as the "Fairvilla Gorilla", which had supposedly been sighted in the area.

Notes

Unincorporated communities in Orange County, Florida
Unincorporated communities in Florida